Ernst Christian Carl, 4th Prince of Hohenlohe-Langenburg (7 May 1794 – 12 April 1860) was the son of Prince Charles Louis of Hohenlohe-Langenburg and Countess Amalie Henriette of Solms-Baruth.

Biography

Marriage
He married Princess Feodora of Leiningen, the only daughter of Emich Carl, 2nd Prince of Leiningen, and Princess Victoria of Saxe-Coburg-Saalfeld on 18 February 1828 at Kensington Palace in London. She was the elder half-sister of the future British queen.

He succeeded to the title of 4th Prince zu Hohenlohe-Langenburg on 4 April 1825, and attained the rank of Major-General.

Issue

Orders and decorations
 :
 Knight of the Military Merit Order, 3 July 1815
 Grand Cross of the Order of the Württemberg Crown, 1830
 Grand Cross of the Friedrich Order, 1839
 : Honorary Knight Grand Cross of the Most Honourable Order of the Bath (civil division), 22 January 1848

Ancestry

References 

1794 births
1860 deaths
Princes of Hohenlohe-Langenburg
House of Hohenlohe-Langenburg
People from Langenburg
Members of the Württembergian Chamber of Lords
Honorary Knights Grand Cross of the Order of the Bath